The 18th People's Choice Awards, honoring the best in popular culture for 1991, were held on March 17, 1992, at Universal Studios Hollywood, in Universal City, California. They were hosted by Kenny Rogers, and broadcast on CBS.

Aaron Spelling received a special tribute to celebrate his long career in television.

Awards
Winners are listed first, in bold.

References

External links
1992 People's Choice.com

People's Choice Awards
1992 awards in the United States
1992 in California
March 1992 events in the United States